Chantelle Kerry (born 9 June 1996) is an Australian figure skater. As an ice dancer with Andrew Dodds, she is a two-time Australian national champion and has competed at two Four Continents Championships. Earlier in her career, she competed in ladies' singles. She is the 2013 Skate Down Under champion and 2013 Australian national champion, and competed in the final segment at two Four Continents.

Personal life
Chantelle Kerry was born on 9 June 1996, in Sydney, Australia. She is the daughter of Monica MacDonald, a former competitive ice dancer, and sister of Brendan Kerry, who competes in men's singles.

On June 11, 2022, she became engaged to American ice dancer Zachary Donohue. They were married on September 18, 2022, in Sydney, Australia.

Skating career
Kerry joined a skating club, Macquarie ISC in Sydney, in 2005. She won her first junior national title in the 2010–2011 season and repeated in 2011–2012. She debuted on the ISU Junior Grand Prix series in autumn 2011. In January 2012, Kerry competed at the Winter Youth Olympics and finished 10th. After placing 17th at the 2012 Four Continents Championships, she came in 22nd in the preliminary round at her first World Championships and did not advance further.

In the 2012–2013 season, Kerry became the Australian senior champion and placed 14th at the 2013 Four Continents. At the start of the following season, she won gold at Skate Down Under.

Kerry passed her senior ice dancing tests in 2016 and had a tryout with single skater, Andrew Dodds, in April 2017.
They announced their partnership in mid-May, after Dodds had passed his own dance tests. The two are coached by Monica MacDonald and John Dunn in Sydney, Australia.

In popular culture
In 2018, Andrew Dodds and Chantelle Kerry appeared in the music video of "Before I Go" by Australian singer Guy Sebastian.

Programs

Ice dancing

Single skating

Competitive highlights 
CS: Challenger Series; JGP: Junior Grand Prix

Ice dancing with Dodds

Ladies' singles

References

External links 

 
 

Australian female single skaters
Australian female ice dancers
1996 births
Living people
Figure skaters from Sydney
Figure skaters at the 2012 Winter Youth Olympics
20th-century Australian women
21st-century Australian women